Class 67 may refer to:

British Rail Class 67
JNR Class EF67
NSB Class 67